Sinocorophium heteroceratum is a species of amphipod crustacean. It naturally occurs in Southeast Asia, but was introduced to San Francisco Bay, probably carried in the ballast water of cargo ships.

References

Corophiidea
Crustaceans described in 1938